The Post Office Box Lobby Recycling program is a project of the United States Postal Service (USPS) that was created on October 28, 2008, for mail customers to recycle paper items, using recycling bins placed in the customer lobbies of post office buildings. Some of the goals of the program are to reduce the amount of paper waste going to landfills, which helps to reduce the consumption of fiber from trees used for paper production and greenhouse gas emissions associated with waste disposal. USPS receives revenue from selling the material, and no tax dollars are used to fund the project.

Participation
Some U.S. post offices do not participate in the program, and sometimes recycle paper items independently of the program, in bins in their employee work areas. Some reasons for non-participation are building space constraints and limited personnel at some U.S. post offices. At some post offices, mail received that is undeliverable is recycled. , some U.S. post offices did not participate in the program.

Timeline
In March 2009, the total number of bins was increased by 1,844, to a total of nearly 5,900 recycling bins.

In April 2010, it was reported that the number of post offices participating in the program had increased to 8,064.

Security

The program uses -capacity plastic bins, which USPS refers to as "Slim Jims". The bins have lockable lids and have a narrow insertion slot to maintain customer privacy and limit the potential of discarded mail being stolen for the harvesting of personal information.

See also

 Environmental issues in the United States
 Paper recycling
 Recycling in the United States
 Waste minimisation

References

Further reading

External links 
 (February 12, 2010.) "Recycling in Post Offices expanding." United States Postal Service.
 "Start a Recycling Program for Discarded Lobby Mail." Postal Bulletin 22334. United States Postal Service.
 "USPS: Sustainability." United States Postal Service.

Recycling in the United States
United States Postal Service